Colli is an Italian surname. Notable people with the surname include:

Andrea Colli (born 1966), Italian academic
Daniele Colli (born 1982), Italian road cyclist
Enrico Colli (1896–1982), Italian cross country skier
Giorgio Colli (1917–1979), Italian philosopher
Ilio Colli (1931–1953), Italian skier
Michelangelo Alessandro Colli-Marchi (Michael Colli) (1738– 1808), Austrian general 
Ombretta Colli (born 1943), Italian singer and politician
Piero Colli (1914–2010), Italian footballer
Robert Colli (1898-1980), Austrian colonel of Nazi Germany. 
Tonino Delli Colli (1922–2005), Italian cinematographer
Vincenzo Colli (1899–19??), Italian cross country skier

Italian-language surnames